The 2021 Vuelta Asturias Julio Alvarez Mendo was a road cycling stage race that took place between 30 April and 2 May 2021 in the Asturias region of northwestern Spain. It was the 63rd edition of the Vuelta Asturias and was part of the 2021 UCI Europe Tour calendar as a category 2.1 event.

Teams 
One UCI WorldTeam, ten UCI ProTeams, and four UCI Continental teams made up the fifteen teams that participated in the race. All but two teams fielded the maximum of seven riders:  entered six and  entered five. There was a total of 102 riders that started the race.

UCI WorldTeams

 

UCI ProTeams

 
 
 
 
 
 
 
 
 
 

UCI Continental Teams

Route

Stages

Stage 1 
30 April 2021 — Oviedo to Pola de Lena,

Stage 2 
1 May 2021 — Candás to Cangas del Narcea,

Stage 3 
2 May 2021 — Cangas del Narcea to Alto del Naranco,

Classification leadership table

Final classification standings

General classification

Points classification

Mountains classification

Sprints classification

Young rider classification

Team classification

References

Sources

External links 

Vuelta Asturias
Vuelta Asturias
Vuelta Asturias
Vuelta Asturias
2021